Gnorimoschema nupponeni is a moth in the family Gelechiidae. It was described by Peter Huemer and Ole Karsholt in 2010. It is found on the Crimea and in the southern Ural Mountains.

References

Gnorimoschema
Moths described in 2010